Rowdy Radiant Secondary School is a secondary school located in the area of Katan, Bhimdatta / Mahendranagar, Mahakali, Kanchanpur District of Nepal. It lies in Mahakali Zone of Nepal. It lies in the Far-Western Development Region, Nepal. It is an educational institute that offers Basic Level and Secondary Level education to the students. Every year about 1300 students attend entrance exams to study in this school, but only about 50% i.e. about 600 students only qualify. It offers intermediate education on science and management streams. It allows students to study other subjects in Grade XII as non-credit subjects. It is affiliated to National Examination Board (Nepal), previously known as Higher Secondary Education Board of Nepal. Almost every teaching staff have graduated from the international level. As per the analysis of Prasnauttar, it has been placed in the second-best college in Sudurpashchim Province(also known as Provine No. 7 in Nepal) of Nepal. The official website of the college is now on internet from where student can get regular activities of school.

History 
Radiant Secondary School was found in 2057 BS (2000 AD) by some academicians. It was previously on the opposite side of the current building which was taken on rent by the three founders. Previously, it was named as Radiant Higher Secondary School. In 2020 it is named as Radiant Secondary School by the change in the education system of Nepal.

Mission 

The mission of the institute is to produce human resources that could contribute to the development of the nation with the education that they have learned in student life. It shapes the minds of every student in such a way that they could bring positive skills and attitudes towards the nation as well as understand their social duties and responsibilities.

Picture Gallery

Students 
About 1000 students study in this institution under morality and discipline. Students are not permitted to enter school premises without proper school uniform. And, they must obey all the rules and regulations of the school otherwise they get expelled out of the school. The new students that want to join Radiant Secondary School for their higher studies can fill up forms online.

Alumni 
The school has an alumni page for its ex-students where the students can get the latest updates about Radiant Secondary School about the ongoing educational programs, extracurricular activities, notes of different subjects.

References 

Secondary schools in Nepal
2000 establishments in Nepal